The relativistic Breit–Wigner distribution (after the 1936 nuclear resonance formula of Gregory Breit and Eugene Wigner) is a continuous probability distribution with the following probability density function,

where  is a constant of proportionality, equal to 
   with   
(This equation is written using natural units, .)

It is most often used to model resonances (unstable particles) in high-energy physics.

Usage

(For example, in the decay of the rho meson into a pair of pions.) The factor of 2 that multiplies Γ2 should also be replaced with 2 
(or  4/2, etc.) when the resonance is wide.

The form of the relativistic Breit–Wigner distribution arises from the propagator of an unstable particle, which has a denominator of the form . (Here, 2 is the square of the four-momentum carried by that particle in the tree Feynman diagram involved.) The propagator in its rest frame then is proportional to the quantum-mechanical amplitude for the decay utilized to reconstruct that resonance,

The resulting probability distribution is proportional to the absolute square of the amplitude, so then the above relativistic Breit–Wigner distribution for the probability density function.

The form of this distribution is similar to the amplitude of the solution to the classical equation of motion for a driven harmonic oscillator damped and driven by a sinusoidal external force. It has the standard resonance form of the Lorentz, or Cauchy distribution, but involves relativistic variables  = 2, here = 2. The distribution is the solution of the differential equation for the amplitude squared w.r.t. the energy energy (frequency),  in such a classical forced oscillator,

with

Gaussian broadening 
In experiment, the incident beam that produces resonance  always has some spread of energy around a central value. Usually,  that is a Gaussian/normal distribution.  The resulting   resonance shape in this case is given by the convolution of the Breit–Wigner and the Gaussian distribution,

This function can be simplified  by introducing new variables,

to obtain

where the relativistic line broadening function  has the following definition,

 is the relativistic counterpart of the similar line-broadening function  for the Voigt profile used in spectroscopy (see also Section 7.19 of ).

References 

Continuous distributions
Particle physics